Guasanas is a dish from Mexico consisting of green chickpeas, water and salt.  The chickpeas are steamed and shelled before serving.

Guasanas are green chickpeas. They come from a legume plant of about 50 cm in height, it has small white flowers and it sprouts small pods that contain about two to three guasana seeds.

References

External links
Recipe at Food.com

Chickpea dishes
Mexican cuisine